Luciano Storace (22 July 1922, Genoa -5 August 2001, Genoa) was an Italian entomologist who specialised in Lepidoptera
He wrote many scientific publications notably on the taxonomy of the butterflies of Africa.  
His collection is in Museo Civico di Storia Naturale di Genova where he was employed.
Luciano Storace was a Member of Società Entomologica Italiana.

External links
Biographies of the Entomologists of the World

References
Anonym 2002: [Storace, L.] Boll. Soc. geogr. ital. 134 (1) : 91
Poggi, R. 2013 Il contributo degli esploratori italiani alle collezioni africane del Museo Civico di storia Naturale "Giacomo Doria" di Genova. Natura, Rivista di Scienze Naturali., Milano 103 (1) : 11-18
Poggi, R.; Conci, C. 1996: [Storace, L.] Memorie della Società Entomologica Italiana, Genova 75:108

Italian lepidopterists
1922 births
2001 deaths